Theodore Marburg Sr. (July 10, 1862 – March 4, 1946) was an American jurist, diplomat and internationalist.

Biography
He was born on July 10, 1862 in Baltimore, Maryland. He was the United States Minister to Belgium from 1912 to 1914. He was the executive secretary of the  League to Enforce Peace, and a prominent advocate of the League of Nations.

He died on March 4, 1946.

Legacy
His papers are archived at the Library of Congress. His daughter, Christine, married Dutch statesman Alidius Tjarda van Starkenborgh Stachouwer. His son, Theodore Marburg Jr. was one of a small number of Americans who joined the British to fight in World War I before the Americans joined the war.

References

Further reading
Atkinson, Henry A. Theodore Marburg : the man and his work  New York (1951)

1862 births
1946 deaths
Ambassadors of the United States to Belgium
People from Baltimore